Khalilan-e Sofla (also Romanized as Khalīlān-e Soflá) is a village in Sar Firuzabad Rural District, Firuzabad District, Kermanshah County, Kermanshah Province, Iran. At the 2006 census, its population was 26, in 5 families.

References 

Populated places in Kermanshah County